The Heist is a 2014 spy novel by Daniel Silva. It is the fourteenth in the Gabriel Allon series. It was released in July 2014 and within two weeks was a New York Times Bestseller. It focused on the recovery of stolen art work.

References

External links
The Heist

Novels by Daniel Silva
2014 American novels
HarperCollins books